Carla Bodendorf (née Rietig on 13 August 1953 in Eilsleben, Bezirk Magdeburg) is a retired East German sprint runner who won a gold medal in the 4 × 100 m relay at the 1976 Summer Olympics; individually she finished fourth in the 200 meters. She won two bronze medals in these events at the 1978 European Athletics Championships.

She was part of two East German 4×100 relay teams that held the world record for three years from 1976 to 1979.

After retiring from competitions, Bodendorf worked as a sports teacher, and then became a politician and project manager at the Ministry of Internal Affairs of Saxony-Anhalt. She is married to Jürgen Bodendorf, a long and triple jumper and a football coach.

References

1953 births
Living people
People from Börde (district)
People from Bezirk Magdeburg
East German female sprinters
Sportspeople from Saxony-Anhalt
Olympic athletes of East Germany
Olympic gold medalists for East Germany
Athletes (track and field) at the 1976 Summer Olympics
European Athletics Championships medalists
Medalists at the 1976 Summer Olympics
Olympic gold medalists in athletics (track and field)
Recipients of the Patriotic Order of Merit in silver
Olympic female sprinters